Stay is a 2005 American psychological thriller directed by Marc Forster and written by David Benioff. It stars Ewan McGregor, Naomi Watts, Ryan Gosling and Bob Hoskins, with production by Regency and distribution by 20th Century Fox. The film represents intense relationships centering on reality, love, death, suicide, and the afterlife.

Plot
Henry Letham sits next to a car crash on the Brooklyn Bridge. He gets up and leaves the site of the crash. Psychiatrist Sam Foster and his girlfriend, Lila meet up before work. Sam discusses his new patient, Henry, a college student and aspiring artist whom he describes as depressed and paranoid, with feelings of guilt and remorse. During Sam's first meeting with Henry, Henry mentions that he sometimes hears voices, and seems able to predict future events. Henry is also suspicious of Sam because his regular psychiatrist, Beth Levy, has suddenly taken leave.

Sam meets with Henry after playing chess with a friend. When he introduces his friend, Leon, Henry is upset, because he says the man is his dead father. Leon doesn't recognize Henry, and leaves the room.

That night Sam attempts to call Beth but to no avail. The next day, Henry hints to Sam of his plans to kill himself that Saturday at midnight. Lila, who has survived a past suicide attempt, offers to help to dissuade Henry from killing himself. Henry disappears that night.

Sam investigates Henry's circumstances and, after repeatedly attempting to reach Dr. Levy, comes to her apartment to find her disoriented and lethargic, mumbling incoherent phrases.

Henry, who had earlier claimed his parents were dead, has his account contradicted by Sam when he finds Henry's mother and her dog living in a bare house, confused about Sam's identity and refusing to respond to his questions. Henry's mother's head starts bleeding and when Sam attempts to help her, her dog bites him.

At the clinic, while having his dog-bitten arm treated, Sam discusses the visit with a present police officer who is curious as to why he would visit that house. Sam explains what happened, but the police officer tells him that he had attended the funeral of the woman who lived there several months ago. This seems to send Sam into a fugue in which the same scene and dialogue is repeated several times.

Later, Sam contacts a waitress named Athena, with whom Henry has mentioned that he had fallen in love. She is an aspiring actress and he meets her at a script reading where she is reading lines from Hamlet with another man. She agrees to take him to Henry, but after a long trip down winding staircases he loses her. When he gets back to the rehearsal room, she is there reading the same lines as when he first encountered her.

The search continues until 11:33 pm on Saturday, less than half an hour before Henry plans to kill himself. At a bookshop known to have been frequented by Henry, Sam finds a painting that Henry had painted and bartered for books about Henry's favorite artist. He learns that the artist killed himself on the Brooklyn Bridge on his 21st birthday. Henry's twenty-first birthday is Sunday, and Sam realizes that Henry plans to commit suicide on the Brooklyn Bridge in imitation of the artist.

Sam finds Henry on the Brooklyn Bridge in a physical atmosphere that is increasingly unraveling. Sam admits to Henry that he doesn't know what is real anymore. Henry tells Sam that he is real, and he was just trying to help him. Henry tells Sam that he now knows the world is a dream, and shoots himself with his gun.

The car crash of the first scene is then reprised. Henry was fatally wounded in the crash but, in his last moments, is suffering survivor guilt, thus spending his final moment in the dream in which the story occurred. Each of the characters introduced earlier in the film was in fact a random spectator at the site of the crash, including doctor Sam and nurse Lila, who treat Henry in an attempt to save him. The brief remarks they make are the same ones heard previously by their counterparts earlier. (Also, the paintings seen throughout the movie, like in the entry way of the classroom that Henry remarked were terrible, and in the bookstore, are shown to be the last images that a dying Henry sees around him on the bridge).

They fail to rescue Henry, and Henry dies, but not before seeing Lila as Athena and proposing to her, which Lila accepts out of sympathy. Sam asks Lila out for coffee, saying that he cannot sleep after what happened.

Cast

 Ewan McGregor as Dr. Sam Foster
 Naomi Watts as Lila Culpepper
 Ryan Gosling as Henry Letham
 Bob Hoskins as Dr. Leon Patterson
 Janeane Garofalo as Dr. Beth Levy
 Elizabeth Reaser as Athena
 B.D. Wong as Dr. Bradley Ren
 Kate Burton as Maureen Letham
 Amy Sedaris as Toni
 Isaach de Bankolé as The Professor
 Michael Gaston as Sheriff Kennelly
 Mark Margolis as the book store owner
 Michael Devine as Security Guard
 Riley G Matthews Jr as Officer #1
 Vito Violante as Officer #2

Production

Marc Forster's directorial style is artistic, referencing many other films including Vertigo. Details such as the length of a character's trousers and what he is wearing on his feet are significant, too. Forster has spoken of the film's stylistic link to the films of Nicolas Roeg as there are what appear to be continuity mistakes, which are in fact tied into the plot.
In an interview with The Collider, Forster confirmed filming took place during late fall 2003, and editing went through several stages, as he took some time off to promote his 2004 fantasy drama film Finding Neverland in order to release the two films separately. The final draft of the movie was finished by January 2005.

Reception

Box office
The film was a massive box office failure, with a domestic gross of $3,626,883 and a foreign gross of $4,856,914, making a total worldwide gross of $8,483,797; it did not come close to making up for its estimated budget of $50,000,000.

Critical response
Critical reaction to Stay was mixed. At review aggregator Rotten Tomatoes, 26% of 124 critics positively reviewed the film, and the average rating is 4.66/10. The critical consensus reads: "A muddled brain-teaser, Stay has a solid cast and innovative visuals but little beneath the surface." According to Metacritic, which compiled 29 reviews and calculated an average score of 41 out of 100, the film received "mixed or average reviews". Roger Ebert of the Chicago Sun-Times gave the film 3½ stars out of four, saying, "The ending is an explanation, but not a solution. For a solution we have to think back through the whole film, and now the visual style becomes a guide. It is an illustration of the way the materials of life can be shaped for the purposes of the moment." Peter Travers of Rolling Stone also praised the film, awarding it three stars out of four and saying, "Some people find this twisty and twisted psychological thriller arty and pretentious. I find it arty and provocative."

James Berardinelli of ReelViews gave Stay 2½ stars out of four, calling it "interesting" but finding it "hard to recommend to anyone but the small cadre of David Lynch devotees who will inhale anything with a whiff of similarity to their favorite auteur's scent." Lisa Schwarzbaum of Entertainment Weekly gave the film a "C", praising the "profuse imagery" but ultimately feeling it to be "a tepid film" with "flat characters" and "anchorless performances".

Many critics had far more negative assessments. Lou Lumenick of the New York Post panned the film, calling it "a trite, incoherent and pretentious bomb."  Rex Reed of The New York Observer wrote, "This is the kind of flop that makes even the popcorn taste lousy." Andrew O'Hehir wrote in Salon, "A lot of talent gets expended in Stay. (I'm not including whoever dressed McGregor.) Too bad the movie they made, while effective in short spurts, is almost a complete waste of time. Michael Booth wrote in The Denver Post, "What's this movie about?"  and added, "Stay goes nowhere for far too long, then tries to go everywhere in just a couple of final moments. I can’t tell you how they try to explain it, in part because that would give away what little satisfaction the movie holds, and in part because I have no blooming idea.

See also
 An Occurrence at Owl Creek Bridge
 Jacob's Ladder

References

External links
 
 
 

2005 films
2005 psychological thriller films
American psychological thriller films
Films about road accidents and incidents
Films directed by Marc Forster
20th Century Fox films
Regency Enterprises films
Films with screenplays by David Benioff
Films produced by Arnon Milchan
2000s English-language films
2000s American films